Mirjam Tola is an Albanian operatic soprano and voice teacher. She is also an Austrian citizen.

Life 
In Tirana she had her opera debut in the female title role in Bastien und Bastienne. She was a finalist in several international singing competitions, such as the Verdi Competition in Busseto, the Puccini Competition Licia Albanese in New York and the Zachary Competition in Los Angeles in 2001. At the Vienna State Opera she was awarded a sponsorship prize at the  ceremony.

From 2004 to 2006 Tola was engaged at the Ljubljana Opera House. Guest appearances took her to the Berlin State Opera, and from 2007 to the Teatro Verdi in Trieste and the Kleines Festspielhaus in Salzburg. In 2008 Tola made her Hamburg debut in her signature role, the title role in Tosca, and from 2010 to 2012 she was engaged as an ensemble member at the Hamburg State Opera, where she subsequently continued to appear as a guest. Further engagements took her to the Staatstheater Meiningen, the Wuppertal Opera House, the Staatstheater Kassel, the Essen Aalto Theater, the Teatro Grande in Brescia, the Teatro Ponchielli in Cremona, the Teatro Fraschini in Pavia and the Arena in Verona.

She has also performed at New York's Carnegie Hall and Lincoln Center, among other venues. Her concert repertoire includes, for example, the soprano parts in Beethoven's 9th Symphony and in sacred works such as Verdi's Messa da Requiem, Mozart's Coronation Mass and Schubert's Lazarus.

Tola also acts as a jury member, for example at the Albanian classical music competition Virtuozet in 2018.

Repertoire (selection)
 Puccini: title role in Tosca, title role in Suor Angelica, Mimi and Musetta in La Bohème, Cio-Cio-San in Madama Butterfly, Liù in Turandot
 Verdi: Desdemona in Otello, Elisabeth in Don Carlos, Leonora in Il trovatore, Amelia in Un ballo in maschera, Lady Macbeth in Macbeth
 Mozart: Countess Almaviva in Le nozze di Figaro, Fiordiligi in Così fan tutte, Bastienne in Bastien und Bastienne
 Giordano: Maddalena in Andrea Chénier
 Bellini: Adalgisa in Norma
 Leoncavallo: Nedda in Pagliacci
 Tchaikovsky: Tatjana in Eugene Onegin
 Brecht/Weill: Anna in The Seven Deadly Sins
 Prokofiev: Fata Morgana in The Love for Three Oranges
 Bizet: Micaëla in Carmen
 Rossini: Zaida in Il turco in Italia

References

External links

 Mirjam Tola on OPERABASE.COM
 Mirjam Tola on YouTube
 Sound recordings of Mirjam Tola on NETOPS

Albanian operatic sopranos
Musicians from Tirana
Albanian expatriates in Austria
Living people
1972 births